Lamine Traoré (born 21 September 1993) is a Malian international footballer who plays as a striker.

Career
Born in Bamako, Traoré has played for Onze Créateurs, Stade Gabèsien and CO Médenine.

He made his international debut for Mali in 2015.

References

1993 births
Living people
Malian footballers
Mali international footballers
AS Onze Créateurs de Niaréla players
Stade Gabèsien players
CO Médenine players
Wej SC players
Saudi Second Division players
Tunisian Ligue Professionnelle 1 players
Association football forwards
Malian expatriate footballers
Malian expatriate sportspeople in Tunisia
Malian expatriate sportspeople in Saudi Arabia
Expatriate footballers in Tunisia
Expatriate footballers in Saudi Arabia
Sportspeople from Bamako
21st-century Malian people
Mali A' international footballers
2016 African Nations Championship players